The 2017 Open du Pays d'Aix was a professional tennis tournament played on clay courts. It was the fourth edition of the tournament which was part of the 2017 ATP Challenger Tour. It took place in Aix-en-Provence, France between 8 and 14 May 2017.

Singles main-draw entrants

Seeds

 1 Rankings as of May 1, 2017.

Other entrants
The following players received wildcards into the singles main draw:
  Maxime Janvier
  Corentin Moutet
  Alexandre Müller

The following player received entry into the singles main draw as an alternate:
  Pedro Sousa

The following player received entry into the singles main draw using a special exempt:
  Tommy Paul

The following players received entry from the qualifying draw:
  Elliot Benchetrit
  Maxime Hamou
  Andrés Molteni
  Mikael Ymer

The following players received entry as lucky losers:
  Clément Geens
  Axel Michon
  Louis Tessa

Champions

Singles

 Frances Tiafoe def.  Jérémy Chardy 6–3, 4–6, 7–6(7–5).

Doubles

 Wesley Koolhof /  Matwé Middelkoop def.  Andre Begemann /  Jérémy Chardy 2–6, 6–4, [16–14].

External links
Official Website

Open du Pays d'Aix
Open du Pays d'Aix
Open du Pays d'Aix